Alberta Provincial Highway No. 51, commonly referred to as Highway 51, was a short east–west highway in central Alberta, Canada that existed between the 1950s and January 1988.  It is now part of Highway 12.

Route description 
Highway 51 was a short highway that originated at the Highway 12 /  Highway 20 intersection in Bentley and travelled west, running parallel to Highway 11.  It was mostly gravel, ending at Highway 761 north of Leslieville.

History 
Highway 51 began appearing on maps in the 1950s and followed Township Road 404 west of Bentley. At the time, Highway 12 turned north at Bentley and continued towards Rimbey and Breton, while Highway 20 connected Bentley to Sylvan Lake. In January 1988, Highway 51 was renumbered to Highway 12, while the section of Highway 12 north of Bentley became part of Highway 20.

References 

051
051